The Minister of Transport and Communications is one of the Finnish Government's ministerial positions. The Minister of Transport and Communications heads the Ministry of Transport and Communications. 

The incumbent holder of the position is Timo Harakka of the Social Democratic Party.

Ministers

Former minister of Transport and Communications Anne Berner 

A key political initiative of minister Berner's term has been a new transport code, consisting of a complete reform of the legalization governing the markets in the transport sector. The transport code reform has been seen as ground breaking in Europe, heavily deregulating existing transport legalization and on the other hand laying grounds for future transport models such as Mobility as a Service. The legal project will be implemented in three stages, with new road traffic legalization already presented to the parliament in August 2016.

Berner has been proposed several means for Finland to meet its environmental and climate commitments set under the UN's Paris Agreement. Berner has stated that Finland would halve the amount of fossil fuel used in transport by 2030. In addition to promote more environmentally friendly propulsion means, such as biofuels and electrical vehicles, Berner has spoken for reducing the total mileage required by the society to produce its services.

As a part of the key project and reforms defined in the Finnish Strategic Government Programme, Berner is working on a general deregulation and reduced administrative load in Finland. Another of the key effort Berner is handling calls for growth through digital services, e.g. digitalization, big data and robotization. Berner has also laid several initiatives in these fields, calling for Finland to drive leadership in the development and utilization of new technologies, including 5G networks, autonomous transport and IoT-based solutions.

References

See also 
 Politics of Finland

Lists of government ministers of Finland